Events from the year 1672 in France

Incumbents
 Monarch – Louis XIV

Events

1672 to 1678 – the Franco-Dutch War

Births

Full date missing
Antoine Augustin Calmet, Benedictine monk (died 1757)

Deaths
 February 17 – Madeleine Béjart, French actress and theatre director (b. 1618)

Full date missing
Jacques Rohault, philosopher, physicist and mathematician (born 1618)
Pierre Séguier, statesman (born 1588)
Denis Gaultier, lutenist and composer (born c.1600)
Tanneguy Le Fèvre, scholar (born 1615)
Thomas Gobert, priest and composer (born c.1600)
Antoine Godeau, bishop, poet and exegete (born 1605)

See also

References

1670s in France